The Hart Building, at 423-425 4th St. in Marysville, California, was built in 1927.  It was listed on the National Register of Historic Places in 1982.  It has also been known as the Brown Building and as the Nagler Building.

It is Maryville's only skyscraper.

It was built for the Hart Brothers, of Sacramento, California.  It was designed by architects Dean & Dean and built by Sacramento general contractor George Hudnutt.

References

National Register of Historic Places in Yuba County, California
Buildings and structures completed in 1927